Kiki (stylized in all caps) is the debut album of American singer, songwriter, and actress Kiana Ledé, released April 3, 2020, by the Heavy Group and Republic Records. The album was followed by an EP of acoustic versions of songs from the album which was released June 26, and a deluxe edition released October 23.

The release date was also the artist's 23rd birthday. The album's cover art features Ledé posed in front of her childhood home, and the title is taken from her childhood nickname.

Reception 
Okayplayers Robyn Mowatt called Kiki "a stellar debut album fit for the rising artist, especially since the release is equipped with an effective, stripped-down sound produced by Mike Woods", and said that "the entire album sum[s] up Kiana's artistic journey and point to how her sound is ever-evolving." New Wave Magazine praised Ledé's lyricism as "manag[ing] to keep her audiences' ears pricked" and wrote that "Ultimately, Kiki is not just another R&B album. Ledé exhibits a growing command of her definitive sound, through the release of an album that feels authentic and unapologetically empowering." Clashs Robin Murray wrote that Kiki "certainly shines", "is a record that exudes joy", and is a "careful blend of light and shade illuminating club bumpers with a depth of emotion".

About the deluxe version of the album, Beyond the Stages Nick Browne wrote that "Ledé gave her debut album an extra burst of life with the addition of new tracks on the deluxe version", that the "vibes are truly immaculate and these songs will be on replay after the first listen", and that the "singer showcases her roots in her signature R&B sound with both beautiful lyrics and synths."

Track listing

Standard edition

Deluxe version 
The deluxe version of the album adds six songs to the start of the track list, designated as disc one, and one song to the end of the standard track list which is designated as disc two.

Notes 
All track names stylized with a period at the end, such as "Second Chances."

Samples 
 "Mad at Me" contains elements of "So Fresh, So Clean", written by Andre Benjamin, Antwan Patton and David Sheats.
 "Labels" contains elements from "Juicy Fruit", written by James Mtume.
 "Honest" contains elements from "Have You Ever?", written by Diane Warren and performed by Brandy Norwood.
 "Cancelled" contains elements of a TikTok called "I Am a Single Queen" performed by Jasmine Orlando, and "Long Red" written by Leslie West, Felix Pappalardi, John Ventura and Norman Landsberg.

Charts

References 

2020 debut albums
Kiana Ledé albums
Republic Records albums
Contemporary R&B albums by American artists